Mac & Devin Go to High School is a 2012 American stoner comedy film. The film was directed by Dylan Brown and stars rappers Snoop Dogg and Wiz Khalifa (in his film debut) in the title roles, along with Mike Epps, Teairra Mari, Andy Milonakis, Luenell in supporting roles and the voice of Mystikal in a guest appearance. The story follows two high school students, geeky Devin and badman Mac, a stoner who befriends Devin and introduces him to cannabis. The high school's name, "N. Hale", is based on Nate Dogg's real name, Nathaniel Hale, and is also a play on the word "inhale".

The film was released on DVD and Blu-ray on July 3, 2012. The soundtrack, which included the hit "Young, Wild & Free", was released worldwide in stores on December 13, 2011.

Cast
 Snoop Dogg as Mac Johnson
 Wiz Khalifa as Devin Overstreet
 Mike Epps as Mr. Armstrong
 Teairra Mari as Ms. Huck
 Luenell as Principal Cummings
 Paul Iacono as Mahatma Chang Greenberg
 Andy Milonakis as Knees Down
 Mystikal as Slow Burn (Voice)
 Far East Movement as Detention Students
 Samantha Cole as Jasmine
 Bishop Don Magic Juan as Student Service Guy
 Winston Francis as Massage Parlor Bouncer
 Derek D as Assistant Principal Skinfloot
 Teni Panosian as Ashley
 Kendré Berry as Nerdy Chemistry Student
 Alicia Mone't as Jubilance
 Affion Crockett as Captain Kush
 Eunice Kiss as Mamasan
 Andray Johnson as Bail Officer
 Roz Wilson as Study Center Matron
 Carla Howe as Masseuse
 Jamieson Stern as Police Sergeant
 Melissa Howe as Tattoo Parlor Receptionist
 Kelly Pantaleoni as Jenny Billings
 William Stage as himself in the opening scenes.
 Shvona Lavette Chung as M.I.L.F.
 Cordelle Braudus as M.I.L.F.'s Son
 Jennifer Andrade as Munchie Machine Girl
 Young Pilot as A Freshman
 Raul CHAVEZ as Tattoo Artist
 Nasia Aissaoui as Foreign Exchange Student
 Dennis George Brown Jr. as Teacher

Students
 YG (Smoker #2)
 Tyga
 Julian (The Rangers)
 Langston (The Rangers)
 Day Day (The Rangers)
 Handan Yousef (Swedish student)

Hemptathalon
 Ty Dolla $ign as Smoker 1
 YG as Smoker 2
 Kendré Berry as Smoker 3
 Tiffany Hughes as Tooted and Pooted Girl

Production

Soundtrack
The film's soundtrack was released on December 13, 2011, by Snoop Dogg and Wiz Khalifa, also under the title of Mac & Devin Go to High School. "Young, Wild & Free", featuring Bruno Mars, was the most popular song from the album and was successful worldwide: in its first week, the track sold 159,000 digital copies, debuting at number ten on the US Billboard Hot 100 and forty four on the Canadian Hot 100. Snoop Dogg revealed in an interview that the soundtrack's success had inspired him to make a movie based on "Young, Wild & Free", and in March 2012 it was announced that he and Wiz Khalifa would star in the spin-off Mac & Devin Go to High School: The Movie. Production and filming began immediately after the announcement.

Despite, the song "This Weed Iz Mine" being featured in the movie, it did not appear on the soundtrack album.

Background
Snoop Dogg had announced plans to release a film and soundtrack with Wiz Khalifa in January 2011, with the release of the song "Dat Good", originally intended to be the soundtrack's lead single. Wiz Khalifa spoke on the soundtrack, saying: "It's a real big deal because nobody's done it like that as far as a veteran in the game, an OG, a pioneer and then the newest, youngest, most exciting dude in rap coming through, and really just giving people a complete project ... I'm a fan of it, separate myself from making it, [I'm] a huge fan of it. Can't wait."

Location controversy
Much of the film was shot at Mira Costa High School in Manhattan Beach, California, after the Manhattan Beach Unified School District granted a facilities use permit to The Yard Entertainment, the production company. After two days of filming over the weekend of May 7, 2011, production was halted when it was reported that individuals (some involved with the film, some not) were smoking marijuana on campus, leading the school district to revoke the permit. During the shoot, one group drove a car down the front stairs on the high school causing skid marks. Vandalism and theft from classrooms were also reported by teachers, and The Yard reportedly offered reimbursement to at least one.

DVD release
Straight-to-DVD release of the film was scheduled for April 20, 2012, which was then delayed to July 3, 2012. , the DVD had sold 54,641 units in the United States.

Critical response
Mac & Devin Go to High School was panned by critics. Pre-release reviews were negative. After its release, JP DelaCuesta of AllHipHop gave it a 3/10, saying: "There’s no other way to say this except Mac and Devin Go to High School is bad – plain and simple. The on-screen collaboration between these two Hip-Hop heavyweights is a joke, and for their sakes, hopefully a joke that they and everyone involved with Mac and Devin were in on. At the end of the day, the only thing that Mac and Devin Go to High School proves is that we need How High 2, and we need it bad!" Nathan Rabin of The A.V. Club also gave the film a negative review, saying "The protégé completes his evolution when he uses his high-school valedictorian speech to perform 'Young, Wild & Free,' the hit single from Mac & Devin Go To High School. 'Young, Wild & Free' is everything Mac & Devin Go To High School should be but isn’t: fun, light, goofy, entertaining, and young. In moments like this, the movie possesses a strange, disarming innocence, but it forces audiences to endure a punishing gauntlet of misogyny and non-starting comedy to get to that middling moment of moderate enjoyment."

References

External links
 

2012 films
American films about cannabis
American buddy comedy films
2010s buddy comedy films
2012 comedy films
Films shot in Los Angeles County, California
American high school films
2010s high school films
2010s English-language films
2010s American films